Viverridae is a family of small to medium-sized, feliform mammals. The viverrids comprise 33 species placed in 14 genera. This family was named and first described by John Edward Gray in 1821. Viverrids occur all over Africa, southern Europe, and South and Southeast Asia, across the Wallace Line. Their occurrence in Sulawesi and in some of the adjoining islands shows them to be ancient inhabitants of the Old World tropics.

The name comes from the Latin word viverra, meaning "ferret", but ferrets are in a different family, the Mustelidae.

Characteristics

Viverrids have four or five toes on each foot and half-retractile claws. They have six incisors in each jaw and molars with two tubercular grinders behind in the upper jaw, and one in the lower jaw. The tongue is rough with sharp prickles. A pouch or gland occurs beneath the anus, but there is no cecum.

Viverrids are the most primitive of all the families of feliform Carnivora and clearly less specialized than the Felidae. In external characteristics, they are distinguished from the Felidae by the longer muzzle and tuft of facial vibrissae between the lower jaw bones, and by the shorter limbs and the five-toed hind foot with the first digit present. The skull differs by the position of the postpalatine foramina on the maxilla, almost always well in advance of the maxillopalatine suture, and usually about the level of the second premolar; and by the distinct external division of the auditory bulla into its two elements either by a definite groove or, when rarely this is obliterated, by the depression of the tympanic bone in front of the swollen entotympanic. The typical dental formula is: , but the number may be reduced, although never to the same extent as in the Felidae.

Their flesh-shearing carnassial teeth are relatively undeveloped compared to those of other feliform carnivores. Most viverrid species have a penis bone (a baculum).

Classification

Living species
In 1821, Gray defined this family as consisting of the genera Viverra, Genetta, Herpestes, and Suricata. Reginald Innes Pocock later redefined the family as containing a great number of highly diversified genera, and being susceptible of division into several subfamilies, based mainly on the structure of the feet and of some highly specialized scent glands, derived from the skin, which are present in most of the species and are situated in the region of the external generative organs. He subordinated the subfamilies Hemigalinae, Paradoxurinae, Prionodontinae, and Viverrinae to the Viverridae.

In 1833, Edward Turner Bennett described the Malagasy fossa (Cryptoprocta ferox) and subordinated the Cryptoprocta to the Viverridae. A molecular and morphological analysis based on DNA/DNA hybridization experiments suggests that Cryptoprocta does not belong within Viverridae, but is a member of the Eupleridae.

The African palm civet (Nandinia binotata) resembles the civets of the Viverridae, but is genetically distinct and belongs in its own monotypic family, the Nandiniidae. There is little dispute that the Poiana species are viverrids.

DNA analysis based on 29 Carnivora species, comprising 13 Viverrinae species and three species representing Paradoxurus, Paguma and Hemigalinae, confirmed Pocock's assumption that the African linsang Poiana represents the sister group of the genus Genetta. The placement of Prionodon as the sister group of the family Felidae is strongly supported, and it was proposed that the Asiatic linsangs be placed in the monogeneric family Prionodontidae.

Phylogeny
The phylogenetic relationships of Viverridae are shown in the following cladogram:

Extinct species

See also 
List of viverrids

References

External links

 
 University of Michigan's Animal Diversity Web page
 ITIS page
 The Straight Dope on Civet Cats

 
Mammal families
Extant Ypresian first appearances
Taxa named by John Edward Gray